Michael Ronald Grenda, OAM (born 24 April 1962) is a retired road bicycle and track cyclist from Australia, who represented his native country at the 1984 Summer Olympics in Los Angeles, California. There he won the gold medal in the men's 4000m team pursuit, alongside Dean Woods, Kevin Nichols, and Michael Turtur. He was a professional cyclist from 1986 to 1991.  He graduated from the Tasmanian Police Academy in 2014.

References

External links
 

1964 births
Living people
Australian track cyclists
Olympic cyclists of Australia
Olympic gold medalists for Australia
Cyclists at the 1984 Summer Olympics
Cyclists from Tasmania
Place of birth missing (living people)
Olympic medalists in cycling
Recipients of the Medal of the Order of Australia
Australian male cyclists
Medalists at the 1984 Summer Olympics
Commonwealth Games medallists in cycling
Commonwealth Games gold medallists for Australia
Cyclists at the 1982 Commonwealth Games
Medallists at the 1982 Commonwealth Games